Franco John Mostert (born 27 November 1990) is a South African professional rugby union player for Honda Heat and the South Africa national team. His usual position is lock. He was one of the members of the winning Springboks in the 2019 Rugby World Cup in Japan.

He joined  prior to the 2018–19 English Premiership.

Mostert was named in South Africa's squad for the 2019 Rugby World Cup. South Africa went on to win the tournament, defeating England in the final.

It was confirmed he had left Gloucester in June 2020 in order to pursue a career in Japan. It was later confirmed that Mostert returned to Japan Top League competition to sign for Honda Heat for their next season.

Notes

References

External links
 
 

1990 births
Living people
Black Rams Tokyo players
Blue Bulls players
Expatriate rugby union players in Japan
Gloucester Rugby players
Golden Lions players
Lions (United Rugby Championship) players
Mie Honda Heat players
Rugby union locks
Rugby union players from Welkom
South Africa international rugby union players
South African expatriate rugby union players
South African expatriate sportspeople in Japan
South African rugby union players